Ger Egan (born 1990/1991) is a Gaelic footballer who plays for Tyrrellspass and at senior level for the Westmeath county team. 

His uncle Joe Hyland was a goalkeeper for Tyrrellspass, who was part of the team that won the 1999 Westmeath Senior Football Championship. Egan got involved in the senior setup at his club in 2007 when he was 16 years of age and when Pat Flanagan was manager, but he was too young to play at the time. He started playing for the Tyrellspass senior team in 2008.

He was a crucial part of the team, scoring 1–5 (1–4 from open play) to defeat Dublin at Parnell Park, that won the 2019 O'Byrne Cup, his county's first time to win that trophy since 1988. He won his second piece of silverware of 2019 when Westmeath won the 2019 National Football League Division 3 league title by a goal against Laois at Croke Park, Egan scored 1–7 including the crucial goal in 60 minutes. He was named the Man of the Match in that game.

Egan tore his cruciate ligament in a game against Clare in 2019, and underwent surgery on it.

He returned to become part of the Westmeath side that won the 2022 Tailteann Cup, and played in the final.

Honours
Westmeath
 Tailteann Cup (1): 2022
 National Football League Division 3 (1): 2019
 O'Byrne Cup (1): 2019

References

1990s births
Living people
Tyrrellspass Gaelic footballers
Westmeath inter-county Gaelic footballers